Morgan County Courthouse is a historic courthouse located in Versailles, Morgan County, Missouri. It was built in 1889 and is a two-story, Second Empire style red brick building on a limestone block foundation.  It measures 85 feet by 85 feet.  It features an aediculated cupola with decorative details articulated in cast iron, molded tin and wood, with four mansarded corner pavilions of three stories each.

It was listed on the National Register of Historic Places in 1980.

References

County courthouses in Missouri
Courthouses on the National Register of Historic Places in Missouri
Second Empire architecture in Missouri
Government buildings completed in 1889
Buildings and structures in Morgan County, Missouri
National Register of Historic Places in Morgan County, Missouri